The yakshas are a broad class of nature-spirits, usually benevolent, but sometimes mischievous or capricious, connected with water, fertility, trees, the forest, treasure and wilderness. They appear in Hindu, Jain and Buddhist texts, as well as ancient and medieval era temples of South Asia and Southeast Asia as guardian deities.

In Hindu, Jain and Buddhist texts, the  has a dual personality.

Early yakshas

Yakshas appear in Hindu, Jain and Buddhist texts. Several monumental yakshas are known from the time of the Maurya Empire period. They are variously dated from around the 3rd century BCE to the 1st century BCE. These statues are monumental (usually around 2 metres tall), and often bear inscriptions related to their identification as yakshas. They are considered as the first known monumental stone sculptures in India. Two of these monumental yakshas are known from Patna, one from Vidisha and one from Parkham, as well as one yakshini from Vidisha. The  may have originally been the tutelary deity of a city, district, lake, or well. Their worship, together with popular belief in nagas (serpent deities), feminine fertility deities, and mother goddesses, may have had its origin among the early Hindu people of India. Yaksha worship coexisted with the priest-conducted sacrifices of the Vedic period. They were later viewed as the steward deities of the earth and the wealth buried beneath.

In early Indian art, male  are portrayed either as fearsome warriors or as portly, stout and dwarf-like. s are portrayed as beautiful young women with happy round faces and full breasts and hips.

Kubera

In Hindu, Buddhist and Jain Religion, Kubera, the god of wealth and prosperity, is considered the king of the yakshas. He is regarded as the regent of the North (Dikapāla) and a protector of the world (Lokapāla).

His many epithets extol him as the overlord of numerous semi-divine species and the owner of the treasures of the world. Kubera is often depicted with a plump body, adorned with jewels, carrying a money-pot and a club. His vahana (vehicle) is the mongoose. He is often seen with Lakshmi, the Hindu goddess of wealth, fortune and prosperity.

In Buddhism, he is equated with Vaiśravaṇa.

Yakshas in Buddhism

The term also refers to the Twelve Heavenly Generals who guard , the Medicine Buddha. The yakshas of many Buddhist stories are ugly ogres, reborn in that form because of sins committed during their past lives as humans.

One such malevolent yaksha, Silesaloma, appears in the Jataka tales of the Pali Buddhist canon. In the story "Prince Five-Weapons and the Sticky-Haired Demon", Silesaloma is described as being the height of a palm tree, with sharp teeth and two yellow tusks, and a coat of thick, matted fur. A bodhisattva named Prince Panchayudha (Five-Weapons) attempted to kill Silesaloma, but all his attacks, from both his weapons and his bare hands, were thwarted by Silesaloma's sticky hair. Ultimately, Prince Panchayudha impressed Silesaloma with his bravery, and the yaksha decided to let him go. Panchayudha explained that Silesaloma's monstrous state was caused by wicked deeds from his past lives, and he taught the yaksha the five precepts, after which Silesaloma renounced violence and transformed into a friendly forest spirit.

The Mahāmāyūrīvidyārājñī Sūtra, a text that dates back to fourth century or earlier (translated from the Sanskrit by Kumarajiva), gives a large list of yakshas that reside in the classical cities of ancient India who are invoked to seek the protection of the BuddhaDharma:

"The deity Krakucchanda resides in Pataliputra.
Aparajita resides in Sthuno.
The great yaksha Bhadra resides in Saila.
The great deity Manava resides in Uttara.
The great sage Vajrapani though lives in Rajagrha
Often dwells in Mount Grdhrakuta.
The deity Garuda resides in the Vipula mountain.
Citragupta resides in Citemukha.
The yaksha Vakula resides in Rajagrha.
...
The yaksha king Mahagiri resides in Girinagara.
The yaksha Vasava resides in Vaidisa.
The yaksha Karttikeya resides in Rohitaka.
This yaksha Kumara is renowned in the great city.
...
Vaisravana who resides in the city Alakavati,
Located along the jewelled stairway of the Buddha’s descent,
Is surrounded by billions of gods and goddesses.
Such yakshas command huge and powerful contingents of troops
To subjugate adversaries and enemies,
Conquering all.
They are famous throughout all directions.
Imbued with great dignity and virtue,
They come to aid
In the battles between the heavens and asuras.

These deities of virtues and great yaksha generals are located everywhere in Jambudvipa. They uphold and protect the Buddhadharma, generating compassion."

Yakshas in Jainism

Jains mainly maintain cult images of Arihants and Tirthankaras, who have conquered the inner passions and attained moksha. Yakshas and yakshinis are found in pair around the cult images of Jinas, serving as guardian deities. The yaksha is generally on the right-hand side of the Jina image while the yakshini is on the left-hand side. They are regarded mainly as devotees of the Jina and have supernatural powers. They are also wandering through the cycles of births and deaths just like the worldly souls, but have supernatural powers.

The Harivamsapurana (783 CE) refers to them as Shasandevatas. Initially among the yakshas, Manibhadra and Purnabadra yakshas and Bahuputrika yakshini were popular. The yaksha Manibhadra is worshipped by the Jains affiliated with the Tapa Gachchha. During tenth and thirteenth centuries yaksha Saarvanubhuti, or Sarvahna and yakshinis Chakreshvari, Ambika, Padmavati, and Jwalamalini became so popular that independent temples devoted to them were erected.

Yakshas and yakshinis are common among the Murtipujaka Śvētāmbara and Bispanthi Digambara Jains. The Digambara Terapanth movement opposes their worship. Among the Murtipujaka Śvētāmbaras, the Tristutik Gaccha sect (both historical founded by Silagana and Devabhadra, and the modern sect organised by Rajendrasuri) object to the worship of shruta-devatas.

Shasan devatas in Jainism
In Jainism, there are twenty-four yakshas and twenty-four yakshis that serve as śāsanadevatās for the twenty-four tirthankaras: These yakshas are as follows:

 Gomukha
 Mahayaksha
 Trimukha
 Yaksheshvara or Yakshanayaka
 Tumbaru
 Kusuma
 Varanandi or Matanga
 Vijaya or Shyama
 Ajita
 Brahma or Brahmeshvara
 Ishvara or Yakset
 Kumara
 Dandapani 
 Patala
 Kinnara
 Kimpurusha or Garuda
 Gandharva
 Kendra or Yakshendra
 Kubera
 Varuna
 Bhrikuti
 Gomedha or Sarvahna
 Dharanendra or Parshvayaksha
 Matanga

Yakshas in poems
In Kālidāsa's poem Meghadūta, for instance, the  narrator is a romantic figure, pining with love for his missing beloved. By contrast, in the didactic Hindu dialogue of the  "Questions of the ", it is a tutelary spirit of a lake that challenges .

In Mahavamsa poem of Sri Lanka, a local population is given the term Yakkhas. Prince Vijaya encountered the royalty of the yakkhas' queen, Kuveni, in her capital of Lanka pura and conquered them.

Yakshas in Thailand

Yakshas are an important element in Thai temple art and architecture. They are common as guardians of the gates in Buddhist temples throughout the country since at least the 14th century. Ceramic sculptures of guardian yakshas were produced in Thailand, during the Sukhothai and Ayutthaya periods, between the 14th and 16th centuries, at several kiln complexes in northern Thailand. They are mostly depicted with a characteristic face, having big round bulging eyes and protruding fangs, as well as a green complexion. Yakshas and their female counterparts are common in the Buddhist literature of Thailand, such as in The Twelve Sisters and Phra Aphai Mani. As ogres, giants, and ogresses, yakshas are present as well in Thai folklore.

"" is also used as an illustration in order to name the letter ย, the 34th consonant of the Thai alphabet, according to the traditional letter symbols Thai children use to memorise the alphabet.

Gallery

See also

 Dharanendra
 Jambhala
 Kubera
 List of Yakshas
 Manibhadra
 Nalakuvara
 Pañcika
 Sthunakarna
 Suketu
 Vaiśravaṇa
 Vajrapani
 Yaksha Kingdom
 Yakshini
 Yaksha Prashna
 Gnome
 Pygmy (Greek mythology)
 Dwarf (mythology)
 Goblin
 Ogre
 Jinn
 Shedim

References

Sources
 Dictionary of Hindu Lore and Legend by Anna Dhallapiccola

External links 
 
Concept of Yakshi (archived 21 July 2011)

 
Buddhist deities
Characters in the Mahabharata
Harvest deities
Hindu deities
Indian words and phrases
Nature spirits
Non-human races in Hindu mythology
Tutelary deities
Yaksha Kingdom